Davis-Warner House is an historic home located at 8114 Carroll Avenue, Silver Spring, Montgomery County, Maryland.  It is a large, three story frame Queen Anne style residence constructed about 1875.  It is one of the oldest residences around Takoma Park, and one of the only surviving Stick–Eastlake style examples left in the Washington D.C., area.  It was built by John B. and Vorlinda Davis, who also operated a small store on nearby University Boulevard (then called "Old Bladensburg Road").

Background
In the early 20th century it was used as a gambling hall and speakeasy, then from 1940 until 1987, it housed the private "Cynthia Warner School," serving the educational needs of thousands of children of Takoma Park families from elementary through the high school level. In 1987 the property was purchased by the Church of Jesus Christ of Latter-day Saints.  The Church began demolition of the building, but in 1991, Mark and Kira Davis purchased a half-acre section of the plot from the Church, and moved the house 150 meters to a new foundation, out of the way of the Church's construction plans, to preserve it from demolition.

The Davis family restored the building as a residence.  Kira Davis operated her business "PaperFaces" from the location (an art studio and customized paper doll business), and Mark Davis operated an international trade law firm Davis & Leiman PC from the premises as well. In 1997 the Davises sold the property to Douglas A. Harbit and Robert F. Patenaude, who operated a bed and breakfast called The Davis-Warner Inn.  They also qualified the property for registry with the National Register of Historic Places, and ceded development rights to the property in perpetuity to Historic Takoma, a local historic preservation society.  Harbit and Patenaude coined the name "Davis-Warner House" to honor the Davis family that originally built the house, the Davis family that moved and restored the house, and Cynthia Warner, who operated the private school for much of the 20th century.

It was listed on the National Register of Historic Places in 2001.

The Davis-Warner Inn closed in 2006, and in 2010 the building was purchased out of foreclosure by the Missionaries of Charity, who repainted it Marian blue and operated it as a convent.

In 2015, the Davis-Warner Inn was purchased by local architect, Eric Saul, and his wife, Diana Simpson, for use as their primary residence.

References

External links
, including photo in 1999, at Maryland Historical Trust website

Houses completed in 1875
Houses in Montgomery County, Maryland
Houses on the National Register of Historic Places in Maryland
Queen Anne architecture in Maryland
Buildings and structures in Takoma Park, Maryland
National Register of Historic Places in Montgomery County, Maryland
1875 establishments in Maryland
Stick-Eastlake architecture in the United States by state